Sparkasse Hagen is the Sparkasse of Hagen, North Rhine-Westphalia, serving the greater Hagen area. Its former main office, the Sparkasse Hagen tower, was a regional landmark until its demolition in 2004.

See also
List of banks in Germany

External links

Official website

Banks of Germany
Companies based in North Rhine-Westphalia